Antje Jansen (born 1 March 1950) is a former German politician, and member of the Landtag of Schleswig-Holstein from 2009 to 2012.

Early life 
Jansen was born in Kiel.

Political career 
She was a member of the Greens from 1990 to 2001.

Jansen was an unsuccessful Party of Democratic Socialism candidate in the 2002 German federal election.

She was elected in the 2009 Schleswig-Holstein state election.

She led The Left into the 2012 Schleswig-Holstein state election, in which the party experienced electoral wipeout.

References 

1950 births
Living people
Politicians from Lübeck
Alliance 90/The Greens politicians
Party of Democratic Socialism (Germany) politicians
The Left (Germany) politicians

20th-century German politicians
20th-century German women politicians
21st-century German politicians
21st-century German women politicians
Members of the Landtag of Schleswig-Holstein
People from Kiel